Tomáš Wágner (born 6 March 1990) is a Czech professional footballer who plays as a forward for UTA Arad.

Career statistics

References
 
 
 
 

Living people
1990 births
Footballers from Prague
Czech footballers
1. FK Příbram players
FC Viktoria Plzeň players
Czech First League players
Czech Republic under-21 international footballers
Association football forwards
MFK Karviná players
FK Jablonec players
FK Mladá Boleslav players
FC Fastav Zlín players
Nea Salamis Famagusta FC players
Expatriate footballers in Cyprus
Czech expatriate sportspeople in Cyprus